The Type C5 ship is a United States Maritime Administration (MARAD) designation for World War II breakbulk cargo and later a container ship for containerization shipments. The first type C5-class ship was a class of ships constructed and produced in the United States during World War II. The World War II C5-class ship was dry bulk cargo ship built by Bethlehem Steel in Sparrows Point, Maryland. Bethlehem Steel built eight ships in this bulk cargo class and four orders were canceled. The C5 was mainly used as iron ore carriers. The C5 was needed to replace other ships that sank during World War II. First in her class was SS Venore, USMC #1982, delivered on 20 July 1945.
Post World War II, four ships were given C5 class type C5-S-78a, these were roll-on/roll-off container ship built by Ingalls Shipbuilding, Inc. of Pascagoula, Mississippi and operated by the Moore-McCormack Lines. The C5-S-78a had a deadweight tonnage of 16,000 tons.

Ships in class

Ordered during World War II
 C5-S AX1 C5 iron ore carriers, 1948.
  Venore,  USMC #1982, Hull 4411, scrapped 1970
  Marore,  USMC #1983, Hull 4412, scrapped 1970
  Lebore,  USMC #1984, Hull 4413, converted to container ship 1966, scrapped 1972
  Feltore, USMC #1985, Hull 4414, converted to container ship 1967, scrapped 1971
  Chilore, Hull 4445, scrapped 1970
  Santore, Hull 4446, scrapped 1970
  Cubore,  Hull 4457, scrapped 1980
  Baltore, Hull 4458, converted to barge in 1981

Post World War II
 C5-S-78a container ship 1968
  laid down on 1 April 1968 at Ingalls Shipbuilding, Inc. of Pascagoula, Mississippi as SS Mormacksky, Maritime Commission type C5-S-78a.
 SS Mormacstar, a Maritime Administration, roll-on/roll-off container ship. renamed: SS Red Jacket, SS American Rapid, SS Rapid, Cape Nome, and Cape Nome (AK-1014), 3 April 2002, laid up in the National Defense Reserve Fleet, James River Group.
 SS Mormacsea 1969 roll-on/roll-off container ship, renamed Defiance in 1978, renamed American Rover in 1982, renamed Rover in 1983 and scrapped in 1993 at Alang, India.
 SS Mormacsun 1970 roll-on/roll-off container ship, renamed SS Young America in 1970, renamed  in 1986, in active service.

Conversions

 C5-S-37e conversions
 Some C3-S-37a cargo ships were modified in the 1970s to a new C5-S-37e design by the Todd Shipyards Corp., Galveston, Texas.
 James Lykes 1960,  scrapped in 1995.
 Joseph Lykes 1960,  scrapped in 1996.
 Zoella Lykes 1960, scrapped 1995 at Alang.
 John Lykes 1960, scrapped 1995 at Alang.
 Thompson Lykes 1960, rebuilt into a barge in 1994.

 C5-S-73b, Sea Witch class, built by Bath Iron Works for American Export-Isbrandtsen Lines 1968. holds 928  containers.
 C.V.Lightning, converted to C5-S-MA73c, crane ship renamed 
 C.V.Sea Witch, later converted into a chemical carrier, renamed SS Chemical Pioneer
 C.V.Stag Hound, converted to C5-S-MA73c, crane ship renamed SS Cornhusker State (T-ACS-6)
 Export Freedom scrapped in 1997 at Alang
 Export Leader, converted to C5-S-MA73c, crane ship renamed SS Gopher State (T-ACS-4)
 Export Patriot,  scrapped in 1998

 C5-S-MA73c is the  made for the Military Sealift Command, converted by Norfolk SB & DD Company at Norfolk, Virginia

The largest general cargo liners in 1969.
 Alaskan Mail 1968, renamed SS Cape Girardeau 1978. Assigned for non-retention in National Defense Reserve Fleet as of April 2020
 Indian Mail renamed ,assigned for non-retention in the National Defense Reserve Fleet as of April 2020
 Korean Mail built 1969, scrapped 1995.
 Hong Kong Mail built 1968,  renamed  in 1978, scrapped June 2008.
 American Mail (1969) later renamed SS Cleveland, scrapped 2009

See also
 Victory ships
 Liberty ship
 Type C1 ship
 Type C2 ship
 Type C3 ship
 United States Merchant Marine Academy
 List of auxiliaries of the United States Navy

References 

Merchant ships of the United States
World War II merchant ships of the United States
Ship types
Type C5 ships
Type C5-S-73B ships
Container ship classes
Ship classes